Erol Keskin (2 March 1927 – 1 October 2016) was a Turkish football forward who played for Turkey in the 1948 Summer Olympics and 1954 FIFA World Cup. He also played for Fenerbahçe SK and Adalet SK Istanbul.

International statistics

International goals

References

External links

1927 births
2016 deaths
Footballers from Istanbul
Turkish footballers
Turkey international footballers
Association football forwards
1954 FIFA World Cup players
Turkey under-21 international footballers
Footballers at the 1948 Summer Olympics
Olympic footballers of Turkey